St. Joseph's College, Hassan, is a private Catholic university college located in Hassan, in the state of Karnataka, India. The Christian minority college was established by the Jesuits in 2009 and forms part of the St. Joseph's Institutions complex at Hassan. The university college has an enrollment of over 400 in its two bachelor's degree programs. Master in Commerce ( M. com) will be started from the academic year 2022-23.

Courses
St. Joseph's College is affiliated with the University of Mysore that offers degree programs in Bachelor of Commerce (BCom) and Bachelor of Business Management (BBM) through the college.

See also

 List of Jesuit universities and colleges
 List of universities in Karnataka

References

Universities and colleges in Hassan district
Jesuit universities and colleges in India
Educational institutions established in 2009
2009 establishments in Karnataka